Cacia vanikorensis is a species of beetle in the family Cerambycidae. It was described by Jean Baptiste Boisduval in 1835. It is known from Sulawesi.

References

Cacia (beetle)
Beetles described in 1835